Westmere is a residential suburb of Auckland, New Zealand. Westmere is under the local governance of the Auckland Council. The suburb was originally a working-class area, containing some state houses. It largely originated from housing development in the 1920s and is known for its Californian bungalow style architecture. It is now a highly sought-after residential location with extensive redevelopment.

Westmere is broadly bisected by Garnet Road and is bounded by Coxs Bay to the North and the green belt running from Western Springs Reserve, the Auckland Zoo and Western Springs College to the South and West.

In 2016, Auckland Transport proposed changes to Westmere, Pt Chevalier, Arch Hill, and Grey Lynn, which includes the creation of cycleways, new bus stops and shelters, and the addition of pedestrian crossings. Construction is due to begin in early 2023.

Demographics
The statistical area of Westmere North is slightly smaller than the suburb, which extends into the statistical area of Westmere South-Western Springs.

Westmere North had a population of 2,343 at the 2018 New Zealand census, an increase of 48 people (2.1%) since the 2013 census, and an increase of 195 people (9.1%) since the 2006 census. There were 756 households, comprising 1,143 males and 1,200 females, giving a sex ratio of 0.95 males per female. The median age was 40.5 years (compared with 37.4 years nationally), with 489 people (20.9%) aged under 15 years, 438 (18.7%) aged 15 to 29, 1,161 (49.6%) aged 30 to 64, and 255 (10.9%) aged 65 or older.

Ethnicities were 86.3% European/Pākehā, 8.1% Māori, 5.1% Pacific peoples, 9.2% Asian, and 2.2% other ethnicities. People may identify with more than one ethnicity.

The percentage of people born overseas was 20.4%, compared with 27.1% nationally.

Although some people chose not to answer the census's question about religious affiliation, 59.0% had no religion, 30.2% were Christian, 0.1% had Māori religious beliefs, 3.2% were Hindu, 0.4% were Muslim, 0.8% were Buddhist and 2.2% had other religions.

Of those at least 15 years old, 897 (48.4%) people had a bachelor's or higher degree, and 159 (8.6%) people had no formal qualifications. The median income was $53,600, compared with $31,800 nationally. 753 people (40.6%) earned over $70,000 compared to 17.2% nationally. The employment status of those at least 15 was that 1,038 (56.0%) people were employed full-time, 315 (17.0%) were part-time, and 51 (2.8%) were unemployed.

Schools

Pasadena Intermediate School in Point Chevalier is well within walking/cycling distance for students in between primary and secondary. The closest State secondary school is Western Springs College (other options are Avondale College and Mount Albert Grammar School).

References

External links 
Photographs of Westmere held in Auckland Libraries' heritage collections.

Suburbs of Auckland
Waitematā Local Board Area
Populated places around the Waitematā Harbour